Anomis is a genus of moths in the family Erebidae.

Description
Palpi upturned, where the second joint reaching vertex of head and third joint long and slender. Front tuft is blunt. Antennae minutely ciliated in male or pectinated. Thorax and abdomen smoothly scaled. Tibia spineless. Forewings with produced and acute apex. Outer margin angled or produced to a point in the middle. Hindwings with vein 5 from below center of discocellulars. Larva with non-swollen thoracic somites.

Species

Anomis albipunctillum Dognin 1912
Anomis albipunctula Hampson 1926
Anomis albitarsata (Pagenstecher 1888)
Anomis albitibia (Walker 1858)
Anomis albopunctata (Bethune-Baker 1906)
Anomis alluaudi Viette 1965
Anomis angulata (Bethune-Baker 1906)
Anomis apta (Walker 1869)
Anomis argentipuncta Kobes 1982
Anomis aricina Druce 1889
Anomis aroa (Bethune-Baker 1906)
Anomis badia Hampson 1926
Anomis barata Schaus 1911
Anomis benitensis (Holland 1894)
Anomis bicolor Prout 1922
Anomis bidentata (Hampson 1910)
Anomis bipunctata (Kenrick 1917)
Anomis brunnea (Swinhoe 1890)
Anomis calamodes Hampson 1926
Anomis campanalis (Mabille 1880)
Anomis capensis (Gaede 1940)
Anomis cataggelus Dyar 1913
Anomis catarhodois Dyar 1913
Anomis combinans (Walker 1858)
Anomis crassicornis Dyar 1913
Anomis cupienda (Swinhoe 1903)
Anomis curvifera (Walker 1858)
Anomis dealbata Prout 1926
Anomis definata Lucas 1894
Anomis directilinea Schaus 1911
Anomis discursa (Walker 1857)
Anomis editrix (Guenée 1852)
Anomis ekeikei (Bethune-Baker 1906)
Anomis elegans Berio 1956
Anomis endochlora Hampson 1926
Anomis erosa Hübner 1821 – yellow scallop moth
Anomis erosoides (Giacomelli 1915)
Anomis esocampta Hampson 1926
Anomis eucystica Dyar 1913
Anomis eueres Prout 1928
Anomis exacta Hübner 1822
Anomis exaggerata Guenée 1852
Anomis extima (Walker 1858)
Anomis fatme (Stoll 1790)
Anomis figlina Butler 1889
Anomis flammea Schaus 1894
Anomis flava (Fabricius 1775) – tropical anomis moth
Anomis fornax Guenée 1852
Anomis fuliginosa Candeze 1927
Anomis fulminans (Bethune-Baker 1906)
Anomis fulvida Guenée 1852
Anomis gentilis Schaus 1912
Anomis gossypii (Sepp 1848)
Anomis grisea (Pagenstecher 1907)
Anomis gundlachi Schaus 1940
Anomis gymnopus Dyar 1913
Anomis hawaiiensis (Butler 1882)
Anomis hedys (Dyar 1913)
Anomis hemiscopis Dyar 1913
Anomis holortha Hampson 1926
Anomis ignobilis (Walker 1869)
Anomis illita Guenée 1852 (syn: Anomis conducta Walker, [1858], Anomis hostia (Harvey, 1876)) – okra leafworm moth
Anomis impasta Guenée 1852
Anomis innocua Schaus 1911
Anomis involuta (Walker 1858)
Anomis iobapta Prout 1927
Anomis irene Prout 1929
Anomis kebeensis (Bethune-Baker 1906)
Anomis lavaudeni Viette 1968
Anomis leona (Schaus 1893)
Anomis leucosema Hampson 1926
Anomis lineosa (Walker 1865)
Anomis longipennis Sugi 1982
Anomis lophognatha Hampson 1926
Anomis luperca Moschler 1883
Anomis luridula Guenée 1852
Anomis lyona (Swinhoe 1919)
Anomis macronephra Holloway 1982
Anomis madida Viette 1958
Anomis mafalui (Bethune-Baker 1906)
Anomis mandraka Viette 1965
Anomis maxima Berio 1956
Anomis melanosema Berio 1956
Anomis mesogona (Walker 1858)
Anomis metaxantha (Walker 1858)
Anomis microdonta Hampson 1926
Anomis modesta Berio 1956
Anomis mutilata Walker 1859
Anomis nigritarsis (Walker 1858)
Anomis noctivolans (Butler 1880)
Anomis obusta Dognin 1912
Anomis oedema Guenée 1852
Anomis orthopasa Dyar 1913
Anomis patagiata Schaus 1911
Anomis phanerosema Hampson 1926
Anomis picta (Sepp 1848)
Anomis planalis (Swinhoe 1902)
Anomis poliopasta Hampson 1926
Anomis polymorpha Hampson 1926
Anomis prapata Kobes 1982
Anomis prima Swinhoe 1920
Anomis privata (Walker 1865) – hibiscus-leaf caterpillar moth
Anomis properans (Walker 1858)
Anomis psamathodes (Turner, 1902)
Anomis punctulata (Holland 1894)
Anomis pyrocausta Hampson 1926
Anomis pyrotherma Hampson 1926
Anomis regalissima Dyar 1913
Anomis rubida Schaus 1911
Anomis rufescens (Pagenstecher 1884)
Anomis rufescensoides Poole 1989
Anomis sabulifera (Guenée 1852) – angled gem moth
Anomis samoana (Butler 1886)
Anomis schistosema Hampson 1926
Anomis scitipennis (Walker 1863)
Anomis semipallida Prout 1926
Anomis simulatrix (Walker 1865)
Anomis sinensis Berio 1977
Anomis sophistes Dyar 1913
Anomis stermochla Turner 1936
Anomis stigmocraspis Dyar 1913
Anomis subfuscata Berio 1956
Anomis sublineata (Walker 1869)
Anomis subpurpurea (Bethune-Baker 1906)
Anomis subrosealis (Walker 1866)
Anomis subtusnigra Berio 1977
Anomis sumatrana Swinhoe 1920
Anomis tamsi Berio 1940
Anomis texana Riley 1885
Anomis tingescens Dyar 1913
Anomis trichomosia Hampson 1926
Anomis trilineata (Moore 1883)
Anomis vulpicolor (Meyrick 1928)
Anomis vulpina (Butler 1886)
Anomis xanthomicta Hampson 1926

References

Scoliopteryginae
Noctuoidea genera